Paul Little Racing, commonly known as Toll Racing after its sponsor, Toll Holdings, was a motorsport team which competed in the V8 Supercars championship. The team ceased operations at the end of 2005, with driver Anthony Tratt retiring from full-time driving.

History 
Formed in 1998 by Paul Little, Paul Little Racing lasted seven years, running a single car for Anthony Tratt. The team used an EL Falcon in the 1998 season acquired from John Sidney Racing. 1999 saw the team move over to a new inhouse built AU Falcon. In 2003, the team started the year in the old AU Falcon, before their BA Falcon built by Acott Race Craft in Sunbury, Victoria was debuted mid-season. At the end of 2003 the team switched to Holden and gained support from Perkins Engineering. For 2004 the team used a brand new Perkins VY Commodore with Tomas Mezera as the enduro driver alongside Tratt. They continued with Holden in 2005, but with an older VY Commodore, previously used by the team in the 2004 season. At the end of 2005 the team closed its doors.

Complete Bathurst 1000 results

References

Supercars Championship teams
Australian auto racing teams
Sports teams in Victoria (Australia)
Auto racing teams established in 1998
Auto racing teams disestablished in 2005